Sprint Couriers is a Botswana logistics company providing international express mail services. Sprint Couriers is the largest logistics company operating in Botswana.

History
The company was founded in 2006, with 16 employees and 6 vehicles. It expanded to an international service in late 2015 when it established a partnership with Aramex.

See also 

 DHL Express
 Freight company

References

External links 
 
 

Companies of Botswana
2006 establishments in Botswana
Companies listed on the Botswana Stock Exchange
Transport companies established in 2006
2006 establishments in Africa
Companies of Gaborone